Xianyou is a county in the municipal region of Putian, in eastern Fujian province, People's Republic of China.

Administration
The county seat is in Licheng Subdistrict.

Towns (镇, zhen)
 Linan, Xianyou
Laidian
Youyang
Zhongshan
Duwei
Bangtou
Daji
Longhua
Gaiwei
Jiaowei
Fengting
Yuanzhuang

Townships (乡, xiang)
Shicang
Xiangxi
Xiyuan
Shexing
Shufeng

Climate

Notes and references

County-level divisions of Fujian
Putian